Tiffin is a city in Johnson County, Iowa, United States. It is part of the Iowa City, Iowa Metropolitan Statistical Area. The population was 4,512 at the time of the 2020 census. F. W. Kent County Park is located just to the west of Tiffin, and is a popular site for outdoor recreation in Johnson County, being noted for its lake, camping facilities, resident whitetail deer herd and wild turkeys, and its cross-country ski trails through rolling acres of oak and hickory forest.

History
Tiffin was platted in 1867. The name was a transfer from Tiffin, Ohio, the former home of Rolla Johnson, who owned the town site.

Geography
Tiffin is located at  (41.706432, -91.661471).

Demographics

2010 census
As of the census of 2010, there were 1,947 people, 800 households, and 488 families living in the city. The racial makeup of the city was 92.0% White, 2.5% African American, 0.3% Native American, 1.6% Asian, 0.1% Pacific Islander, 0.5% from other races, and 3.0% from two or more races. Hispanic or Latino of any race were 3.6% of the population.

There were 800 households, of which 35.4% had children under the age of 18 living with them, 45.5% were married couples living together, 11.3% had a female householder with no husband present, 4.3% had a male householder with no wife present, and 39.0% were non-families. 27.8% of all households were made up of individuals, and 5.4% had someone living alone who was 65 years of age or older. The average household size was 2.43 and the average family size was 3.04.

The median age in the city was 31.2 years. 27.4% of residents were under the age of 18; 8.6% were between the ages of 18 and 24; 37.3% were from 25 to 44; 19.8% were from 45 to 64; and 6.7% were 65 years of age or older. The gender makeup of the city was 48.9% male and 51.1% female.

2000 census
As of the census of 2000, there were 975 people, 440 households, and 268 families living in the city. The racial makeup of the city was 95.18% White, 1.95% African American, 1.33% Asian, 0.10% Pacific Islander, 0.41% from other races, and 1.03% from two or more races. Hispanic or Latino of any race were 2.36% of the population.

There were 441 households, out of which 30.0% had children under the age of 18 living with them, 47.0% were married couples living together, 11.1% had a female householder with no husband present, and 38.9% were non-families. 29.8% of all households were made up of individuals, and 5.0% had someone living alone who was 65 years of age or older. The average household size was 2.22 and the average family size was 2.75.

23.1% are under the age of 18, 11.8% from 18 to 24, 40.8% from 25 to 44, 17.6% from 45 to 64, and 6.7% who were 65 years of age or older. The median age was 30 years. For every 100 females, there were 97.4 males. For every 100 females age 18 and over, there were 97.4 males.

The median income for a household in the city was $42,381, and the median income for a family was $47,969. Males had a median income of $30,857 versus $25,542 for females. The per capita income for the city was $20,222. About 3.7% of families and 4.3% of the population were below the poverty line, including 5.6% of those under age 18 and 7.0% of those age 65 or over.

Education
Tiffin is a part of the Clear Creek–Amana Community School District and houses Tiffin Elementary School, Clear Creek–Amana Middle School, and Clear Creek–Amana High School.

References

External links
 City website

Cities in Johnson County, Iowa
Cities in Iowa
Iowa City metropolitan area
1867 establishments in Iowa